The Schlumper  is a river of Saxony, Germany.

See also
List of rivers of Saxony

Rivers of Saxony
6Schlumper
Rivers of Germany